Acrocercops argentigera is a moth of the family Gracillariidae, known from Papua New Guinea. It was described by A. Diakonoff in 1955.

References

argentigera
Moths of Asia
Moths described in 1955